BK Tåg AB, trading as BK Tåg, is a former Swedish railway company. It operated passenger trains on public service obligation with various counties and the ministry. Owned by Karlsongruppen, it filed for bankruptcy in March 2005.

References

Railway companies disestablished in 2005
Defunct railway companies of Sweden